Lancaster is a locality in the Goulburn Valley region of Victoria, Australia. The town is located in Shire of Campaspe and the City of Greater Shepparton.

History
The locality was named after Thomas Lancaster, an early settler in the region and the father of the state parliamentarian, Samuel Lancaster.

The Post Office opened on 15 November 1878 and a Kyabram East office opened on 28 November 1878. In 1881 the Lancaster office closed and Kyabram East was renamed Lancaster. This office closed in 1994.

Today
The town has an Australian Rules football team competing in the Kyabram & District Football League.

The town also has a small primary school with about 40 children.

References

External links

Towns in Victoria (Australia)
City of Greater Shepparton